Isli Hidi (born 15 October 1980) is an Albanian professional footballer who plays as a goalkeeper for Albanian club Erzeni.

He started his career with KF Tirana, where he won six Kategoria Superiore winners medals, three Kupa e Shqipërisë winners medals and six Superkupa e Shqipërisë winners medals. In Albania he has also played for KF Bylis, Dinamo Tirana, KF Teuta and KS Kastrioti. He also played in Ukraine for Kryvbas Kryvyi Rih and in Cyprus for Alki Larnaca, Olympiakos Nicosia, AEL Limassol, Apollon Limassol and Nea Salamina. During his time in Cyprus he won one Cypriot First Division winners medal with AEL Limassol and one Cypriot Cup with Apollon Limassol.

Club career
He started off his career at his hometown club, Tirana in 1998. After very few appearances, he was loaned out to Bylis. After making a huge impact, he returned to Tirana to compete for the number 1 shirt. He signed for the Ukrainian club Kryvbas Kryvyi Rih in August 2007. In 2008, Hidi moved to Alki Larnaca for the remainder of the 2008–09 season. Hidi rejoined Kryvbas Kryvyi Rih on a three-year contract for around one million dollars per season on 3 March 2009.

On 6 July 2010, he signed for Dinamo Tirana for the 2010–11 season. On 7 January 2011, Hidi joined Cyprus's Olympiakos Nicosia by inking a contract until the end of the season.

In July 2018, Hidi joined Teuta on a one-year contract, returning to Kategoria Superiore after eight years. In November, he was named league's player of the month after some strong performances. He concluded the 2018–19 season by making 33 league appearances, missing only one match, the one against Tirana in April 2019.

In August 2019, Hidi completed a transfer to Bylis, returning in Ballsh for the first time since 2002 when he was on loan. He took squad number 1 for the 2019–20 season. Hidi made his debut on 24 August in the 1–0 away defeat to his former side Teuta. On 1 September, in his third appearance of the season, Hidi scored his first career goal, a penalty in the 3–0 win at Skënderbeu, guiding the team to their first seasonal win. On 15 September, in the first match following the international break, Hidi scored another penalty, this time at home against Kukësi, aiding Byis to achieve a 2–1 comeback win which lifted them in 4th place in championship. His first goal in Albanian Cup came on 12 February 2020 in the second leg of competition's second round against Laçi, helping Bylis advance to quarter-finals 4–3 on aggregate.

International career
Hidi received his first senior international call-up in May 2005 for the friendly match versus Poland by German coach Hans-Peter Briegel who was impressed by Hidi's performances in Kategoria Superiore with his club at the time Tirana. He earned his first cap in that match, but things could not have started any worse for him as Poland scored in under 2 minutes with Maciej Żurawski. Hidi's second appearance for Albania came later that year, on 17 August against Azerbaijan at Qemal Stafa Stadium; he started again and conceded another early goal, but this time the team bounced back and won 2–1 in front of around 7,300 Albanian fans.

Personal life
In 2017, Hidi begun the application for Cypriot passport.

Career statistics

Club

International

Honours

Club
Tirana
Kategoria Superiore: 1998–99, 1999–00, 2002–03, 2003–04, 2004–05, 2006–07
Kupa e Shqipërisë: 1998–99, 2000–01, 2005–06
Superkupa e Shqipërisë: 2000, 2002, 2003, 2005, 2006, 2007

AEL Limassol
Cypriot First Division: 2011–12

Apollon Limassol
Cypriot Cup: 2015–16

Individual
Kategoria Superiore Player of the Month: November 2018

References

External links

 

1980 births
Living people
Footballers from Tirana
Albanian footballers
Albania international footballers
Association football goalkeepers
KF Tirana players
KF Bylis Ballsh players
FC Kryvbas Kryvyi Rih players
Alki Larnaca FC players
FK Dinamo Tirana players
Olympiakos Nicosia players
AEL Limassol players
Apollon Limassol FC players
Nea Salamis Famagusta FC players
KF Teuta Durrës players
Kategoria Superiore players
Ukrainian Premier League players
Cypriot First Division players
Albanian expatriate footballers
Expatriate footballers in Ukraine
Albanian expatriate sportspeople in Ukraine
Expatriate footballers in Cyprus
Albanian expatriate sportspeople in Cyprus
KS Kastrioti players
KF Erzeni players